Dischord Records is a Washington, D.C.-based independent record label specializing in punk rock. The label is co-owned by Ian MacKaye and Jeff Nelson, who founded Dischord in 1980 to release Minor Disturbance by their band The Teen Idles. With other independent American labels such as Twin/Tone, Touch and Go Records, and SST Records, Dischord helped to spearhead the nationwide network of underground bands that formed the 1980s indie rock scene. These labels presided over the shift from the hardcore punk that then dominated the American underground scene to the more diverse styles of alternative rock that were emerging.

The label is most notable for employing the do it yourself ethic, producing all of its albums and selling them at discount prices without finance from major distributors. Dischord continues to release records by bands from Washington D.C., and to document and support the Washington D.C. music scene. As of October 2016, the label employs four people.

Dischord was a local label in the early days of hardcore, and is one of the more famous independent labels, along with the likes of Alternative Tentacles, Epitaph Records, SST Records, and Touch and Go Records.

The logo of the label was created by Nelson, who has an associate degree in advertising design.

History
Influenced by existing labels like Dangerhouse Records, MacKaye and Nelson took up residence in the now known "Dischord House" and ran the label out of its premises.

Dischord's first release was Minor Disturbance by Teen Idles released in 1980. The band members cut, folded, and glued the record packaging themselves to keep costs down. The label's first split 12" was Faith / Void Split by the bands The Faith and Void.

Dischord limits itself to bands from the D.C. scene. The label offers the same basic deal to all artists: Dischord fronts a certain amount of money to record and manufacture and once those costs are recouped, the label's distributor takes 30 percent of the profit band and the label split the remainder of the profits.

Jeff Nelson has claimed the venture was never intended to be profit-making but was instead simply a way to get their friends albums in fans’ hands.

In spite of criticism over the years about how the label is run, MacKaye claims everything works and will continue to operate in the same fashion of no contracts or lawyers.

In 2017, they put their catalog on Bandcamp for free streaming or purchase.

In May 2021, it was announced that Dischord would be re-releasing the label's first six 7" records in a remastered box set. With the catalog number "Dischord 200", it will consist of singles and EPs by Minor Threat, Government Issue, Teen Idles, SOA, and Youth Brigade.

Roster

Bands such as Minor Threat, Government Issue, The Faith, Void, Iron Cross, Embrace, Rites of Spring, Nation of Ulysses, Scream, Soulside, S.O.A., the Teen Idles, Gray Matter, Jawbox, Marginal Man, Shudder to Think, Dag Nasty, Lungfish  and Fugazi have released records on Dischord.

Additions to the Dischord roster as of the late 1990s and 2000s include Q and Not U, Beauty Pill, Antelope, Soccer Team, French Toast, Faraquet, Black Eyes, The Aquarium, Title Tracks, Edie Sedgwick, Slant 6, and Andalusians. Many of these acts, notably Q and Not U and Black Eyes, are both influential and experimental post-hardcore bands.

Legacy
Dischord Records influenced many other labels such as Simple Machines, Lovitt Records and DeSoto Records.

Notes

References and bibliography

External links
 
 Dischord Records Profile by Southern Records
 Dischord Records Label Spotlight
 Heller, Jason (November 18, 2014). "Primer: Where to start with the righteous noise of Dischord Records". The A.V. Club.

American independent record labels
Record labels established in 1980
Post-hardcore record labels
Punk record labels
Hardcore record labels
Indie rock record labels
Music companies based in Washington, D.C.
Alternative rock record labels